Cops and Robbers is a 1993 Australian-New Zealand film about a bankrupt man who embarks on a career of crime.

References

External links
Cops and Robbers at NZ Film

Australian crime comedy films
1990s English-language films
1993 films
1993 comedy films
1990s Australian films